Borovsk is a town and the administrative center of Borovsky District of Kaluga Oblast, Russia, located on the Protva River just south from the oblast's border with Moscow Oblast. Population:  12,000 (1969).

History
It is known to have existed since 1356 as a part of the Principality of Ryazan. In the 14th century, it was owned by Vladimir the Bold, but passed to the Grand Duchy of Moscow when his granddaughter Maria of Borovsk married Vasily II.

In 1444, the St. Paphnutius Monastery was founded near Borovsk. Its strong walls, towers, and a massive cathedral survive from the reign of Boris Godunov. Two famous Old Believers—archpriest Avvakum Petrovich and boyarynya Feodosiya Morozova—were incarcerated at this monastery in the second half of the 17th century. The town was liberated by the Red Army on January 4, 1942.

Administrative and municipal status
Within the framework of administrative divisions, Borovsk serves as the administrative center of Borovsky District, to which it is directly subordinated. As a municipal division, the town of Borovsk is incorporated within Borovsky Municipal District as Borovsk Urban Settlement.

Culture
Among the monuments of Borovsk are the oldest wooden church in the region (the 17th century) and a museum of Konstantin Tsiolkovsky, who lived and worked there as a teacher in 1880–1891. Borovsk has recently been known for painted façades of its down-town buildings, resulting from a work of one local painter.

Sights 
 Pafnutyevo-Borovsky monastery, an ensemble of architectural monuments of the 16th-17th centuries.
 Church of the Intercession of the Holy Virgin
 Apartment Museum Konstantin Tsiolkovsky
 Gallery of wall paintings created by self-taught artist Vladimir Ovchinnikov
 Monument to Konstantin Tsiolkovsky
 Chapel-monument to the alleged place of detention and the death of Boyar Morozova

References

Notes

Sources

External links

 
Borovsk Business Directory 
Photos from Borovsk
History of Borovsk

Cities and towns in Kaluga Oblast
Borovsky Uyezd